Trekking sarl is a French aircraft manufacturer based in Lambesc. The company specializes in the design and manufacture of paragliders and paramotor wings in the form of ready-to-fly aircraft. The company also produces four-wheel drive truck tents and travel luggage, as well as photo and video accessories.

The company was founded in 1976 by Axel de Neufville in Marseilles. It is organized as a société à responsabilité limitée (sarl), a French private limited company.

Divisions
Trekking Parapentes is the division that constructs paragliders and paramotoring wings and is based in Saint-Mathieu-de-Tréviers, although it was originally in Lambesc.

The division that makes travel luggage, money belts and accessories is based in Lambesc.

The division that makes truck-top tents for four-wheel drive trucks is based in Saint-Cannat.

Aircraft 
Summary of aircraft built by Trekking:
Trekking B-Bus
Trekking Carver
Trekking Elise
Trekking Just One
Trekking K2
Trekking Sebring
Trekking Senso
Trekking Sport
Trekking Trek
Trekking Xenos

References

External links

Aircraft manufacturers of France
Paragliders
Manufacturing companies established in 1976
French companies established in 1976
French brands
Companies based in Provence-Alpes-Côte d'Azur